William Kerr House is a historic home located at Union City, Randolph County, Indiana.  It was designed by architecture firm of George F. Barber & Co. and built about 1896. It is a -story, Queen Anne style brick veneer dwelling.  It has a hipped cross-gable roof sheathed in slate.  It features a hexagonal corner tower, gabled three-sided bays, and a wraparound porch.  Also on the property is a contributing brick garage (c. 1920).

It was added to the National Register of Historic Places in 1987.

References

Houses on the National Register of Historic Places in Indiana
Queen Anne architecture in Indiana
Houses completed in 1896
Buildings and structures in Randolph County, Indiana
National Register of Historic Places in Randolph County, Indiana
1896 establishments in Indiana